Christophe Premat (born 7 December 1976) is a French academic and politician who served as deputy for the Third constituency for French residents overseas in the Assemblée Nationale at Paris, from 2014 to 2017.

A member of the French Socialist Party (Parti socialiste), Premat took over the parliamentary constituency of northern Europe from Axelle Lemaire as her substitute when she became a government minister in May 2014.

Publications (selected) 
 After the Deluge: New Perspectives on the Intellectual and Cultural History of Postwar France (After the Empire: The Francophone World and Post-colonial France) (contributor), Lexington Books, 2004 
 Dictionnaire des relations franco-allemandes, with Isabelle Guinaudeau and Astrid Kufer, 2009 
 Le traitement de l'actualité en classe de français langue étrangère : résultats concrets d'une recherche-action menée auprès de deux publics d'apprenants au profil contrasté, VDM Publishing, 2010 
 Destins d’exilés. Trois philosophes grecs à Paris : Kostas Axelos, Cornelius Castoriadis, Kostas Papaïoannou, with Servanne Jollivet and Mats Rosengren, 2011.

Honours 
  Chevalier, Ordre des Palmes Académiques (2014).

References

External links 
 Premat on the Assemblée Nationale website
 assemblee-nationale.fr
 parti-socialiste.fr
 centredurkheim.fr
 francobritishcouncil.org.uk

1976 births
Living people
People from Annecy
Sciences Po alumni
French political scientists
Socialist Party (France) politicians
21st-century French writers
Chevaliers of the Ordre des Palmes Académiques
French male writers
Deputies of the 14th National Assembly of the French Fifth Republic